Abdelraouf al-Rawabdeh (born 18 February 1939 in Irbid) was the 32nd Prime Minister of Jordan from 4 March 1999 until 19 June 2000, a leading political figure from the north city of Irbid in Jordan.

Political experience
In 1983 Al-Rawabdeh became the Mayor of Amman and would serve in that position until 1989. In 1989 he then joined the Jordanian Parliament as a member of the 11th Parliament of Jordan, and again 1993 and 1997 until 2001 in the 12th and 13th Parliament of Jordan respectively.

On 24 October 2013 he was named President of the Senate. Al-Rawabdeh is the first President of the enlarged Senate, which now has 75 members, where previously there had been 60 members. After his resignation, Al-Rawabdeh was replaced as President of the Senate by Faisal al-Fayez on 25 October 2015.

See also 
 List of prime ministers of Jordan

References

External links
 Prime Ministry of Jordan website

Rawabdeh
Living people
1939 births
People from Irbid
American University of Beirut alumni
Government ministers of Jordan
Transport ministers of Jordan
Health ministers of Jordan
Public works ministers of Jordan
Education ministers of Jordan
Prime ministry affairs ministers of Jordan
Deputy prime ministers of Jordan
Defence ministers of Jordan
Members of the Senate of Jordan
Members of the House of Representatives (Jordan)
Presidents of the Senate of Jordan
Mayors of Amman